Nandasena Pathirana (born 31 December 1942) is a former Sri Lankan cricket umpire. He stood in thirteen ODI games between 1993 and 2001.

See also
 List of One Day International cricket umpires

References

1942 births
Living people
Sri Lankan One Day International cricket umpires
People from Colombo